This is a list of notable people who are currently or have been associated with Australian Christian Churches (ACC).  ACC was formerly known as Assemblies of God in Australia (AOG).

Pastors

Artists/musicians

Politicians

|}

See also
 List of Assemblies of God people

References

 
 
Australian Christian Churches
Australian Christian Churches
Australian Christian Churches